Arthur Law may refer to:

 Arthur Law (playwright) (1844–1913), English playwright, actor and scenic designer
 Arthur Law (field hockey), Welsh field hockey player
 Arthur Law (politician), British Member of Parliament for Rossendale